Princess Maria of Romania (8 September 18709 April 1874) was the only child of Prince (later King) Carol I of Romania and his wife, Elisabeth of Wied.

Life
In her family, the young princess was nicknamed "Mariechen" (a possible homage to her parents' German heritage) or "Itty" (derived from little). Everyone who knew Maria described her as a beautiful and precocious young child, as she was said to look at maps and identify different countries for fun at the age of only two and a half. It is said that sometime before she died, Princess Maria told her mother that she would someday like to be able to ride a star.

Maria had no prospect of inheriting her father's throne; the 1866 Constitution limited succession to males.

Death
On , the Princess became ill with scarlet fever. An epidemic had been ravaging the capital at the time. She was immediately transported to the Peleș Castle. At Elisabeth's request, Maria's tombstone read the Bible verse, :

The funeral service took place at the Cotroceni Church within the grounds of the Cotroceni Royal Palace. The coffin was covered with white satin, criss-crossed with silver lace ornaments and was as large as one for an adult, because the infant princess' body was enclosed in several decreasing size caskets placed one inside another. After the religious service in the Romanian Orthodox rite, the cortege walked through the palace gardens to the burial place next to the palace church. Those gardens were the favorite playing grounds for the young princess, where only half a dozen days previously she had played with her nurse.

Legacy
Maria's parents were devastated by her death. On 5 May that year, Carol wrote to his father Karl Anton, Prince of Hohenzollern, that he and Elisabeth intended to move to the Cotroceni Palace, in order to be closer to the resting place of their infant daughter:

In another letter to Lascăr Catargiu, he wrote:

Maria's death worsened the relationship between Carol and Elisabeth, and they did not have any further children. In 1875, Karl Storck created a bust of the sleeping princess which was erected by her tomb. This bust inspired Elisabeth to write many emotional poems. When Queen Elisabeth died in 1916, according to her wishes, her daughter's remains were exhumed and the casket placed on her coffin for the public procession. Mother and daughter were then buried together in the same tomb at the Cathedral of Curtea de Argeș. At the Elisabeta Palace, one can still see an 1880s style piece of furniture that contains a plaster-mold of the infant princess.

Gallery

Ancestors

References

Bibliography

1870 births
1874 deaths
Princesses of Hohenzollern-Sigmaringen
Romanian princesses
Deaths from streptococcus infection
Infectious disease deaths in Romania
Burials at Curtea de Argeş Cathedral
Royalty and nobility who died as children
Daughters of kings